Trillium sulcatum is a species of flowering plant in the bunchflower family Melanthiaceae. The specific name sulcatum means "furrowed, grooved, or sulcate", which describes the tips of the sepals. It is most abundant on the Cumberland Plateau in central Tennessee and eastern Kentucky where it blooms in April and May. The species is commonly known as the southern red trillium or furrowed wakerobin.

Description
Trillium sulcatum is a perennial, herbaceous, flowering plant that persists by means of an underground rhizome. Like all trilliums, it has a whorl of three bracts (leaves) and a single trimerous flower with three sepals, three petals, two whorls of three stamens each, and three carpels (fused into a single ovary with three stigmas). The flower sits atop a long stalk (called a pedicel) rising above the leaves. The recurved (bent backwards) petals are usually dark red but an occasional white form may be found. The berry is also red.

Trillium sulcatum is often confused with other members of the Trillium erectum group, including Trillium flexipes, Trillium simile, Trillium vaseyi, and especially Trillium erectum. In general, it is distinguished by the relative length of its pedicel. Specifically, the sepals of Trillium sulcatum are less than half as long as the pedicel, whereas they are more than half as long in other members of the group.

Taxonomy
Trillium sulcatum was described and named by Thomas Stewart Patrick in 1984. Its type specimen was collected in Grundy County, Tennessee in 1980. , the name Trillium sulcatum  is widely recognized. It is a member of the Trillium erectum group (Trillium  subgen. Trillium), a group of species typified by Trillium erectum.

Related to this, Lane Barksdale described Trillium erectum var. sulcatum in 1938, but since he did not provide a Latin description, the name is invalid. However, the variety's type specimen, collected in Surry County, North Carolina in 1937, was subsequently identified as Trillium sulcatum, and so the epithet sulcatum was retained in recognition of Barksdale's contribution. Consequently, Trillium sulcatum is often referred to as the Barksdale trillium.

Distribution and habitat
Trillium sulcatum is most abundant on the Cumberland Plateau, from northeastern Alabama and northwestern Georgia northward through central Tennessee into eastern Kentucky. From Tennessee its range extends northeastward into Virginia and, via the New River drainage, into both West Virginia and North Carolina. Unlike other members of the Trillium erectum complex, it is notably absent from the Great Smoky Mountains and the southern Blue Ridge Mountains.

Trillium sulcatum is known to occur in the following counties:

 Alabama: DeKalb, Jackson, Marshall
 Georgia: Dade, Walker
 Kentucky: Bell, Carter, Casey, Harlan, Laurel, Lee, Madison, McCreary, Morgan, Perry, Powell, Pulaski, Rockcastle, Wayne, Whitley
 North Carolina: Alleghany, Ashe, Caldwell, Surry, Watauga, Wilkes
 Tennessee: Anderson, Bledsoe, Campbell, Claiborne, Coffee, Cumberland, DeKalb, Fentress, Franklin, Grundy, Hamblen, Hamilton, Hancock, Hawkins, Johnson, Knox, Lincoln, Marion, Morgan, Pickett, Putnam, Rhea, Roane, Scott, Sequatchie, Sullivan, Van Buren, Warren, White
 Virginia: Carroll, Floyd, Franklin, Giles, Grayson, Henry, Lee, Patrick, Pulaski, Roanoke, Russell, Scott, Smyth, Tazewell, Washington, Wise
 West Virginia: Fayette, McDowell, Mercer

Conservation
The global conservation status of Trillium sulcatum is apparently secure (G4). At the southern edge of its range, it is imperiled (S2) in Georgia and critically imperiled (S1) in Alabama.

References

Bibliography

External links

 
 
 Wildflowers of the United States
 North Carolina Native Plant Society
 Southeastern Flora
 
 

sulcatum
Flora of the Southeastern United States
Flora of the Appalachian Mountains
Flora of West Virginia
Endemic flora of the United States
Least concern flora of the United States
Plants described in 1984